In computational fluid dynamics, free-surface modelling (FSM) refers to the numerical modelling of a free surface—a freely moving interface between immiscible fluids—in order to be able to track and locate it.

Common methods used in free surface modelling include the level-set method and the volume of fluid method.

Simulation software